Q Class or Class Q may refer to:

Locomotives 
 GNRI Class Q, a Great Northern Railway of Ireland locomotive class
 NZR Q class (1878), a New Zealand Railways locomotive class
 NZR Q class (1901), a New Zealand Railways locomotive class
 SR Class Q, a British Southern Railway locomotive class
 WAGR Q class (diesel)

Other uses
 Library of Congress Classification:Class Q -- Science
 Q-class destroyer, a class of warships used by the Royal Navy, Royal Netherlands Navy, and Royal Australian Navy
 Classical Quarterly, abbreviated Class. Q.